A skeleton crew is the minimum number of personnel needed to operate and maintain an item.

Skeleton crew may also refer to:

Music
Skeleton Crew (band), an American experimental rock and jazz group
Skeleton Crew, an American record label co-founded by Frank Iero
Skeleton Crew, a 2015 album by Madisen Ward and the Mama Bear

Other media
Skeleton Crew (short story collection), a 1985 collection of short fiction by Stephen King
Skeleton Crew (comics), a group of Marvel Comics supervillains
Skeleton Crew (film), a Finnish horror film
Skeleton Crew (play), a 2016 play by Dominique Morisseau
The Skeleton Crew (book), a 2014 true-crime book
Bones: Skeleton Crew, a web series
"Skeleton Crew", an episode of American TV series JAG
Star Wars: Skeleton Crew, an upcoming Star Wars TV series, set to release in 2023